Giovanni Antonio Viscardi (27 December 1645 – 9 September 1713) was a Swiss architect of the baroque, who worked mostly in Bavaria.

Biography

Giovanni Antonio Viscardi was born in San Vittore, Grisons.  He was descended from a family which provided several architects who had worked in Bavaria, Styria and Mainz.

He started his career as a Superintendent to Enrico Zuccalli before 1675; in 1678 he was appointed master mason and in 1685 chief architect. Dismissed in 1689, Viscardi worked as an independent architect until he became Zuccalli's successor as chief architect of the Bavarian court in 1706 with the Austrian occupation of Bavaria; he died, aged 67, in Munich, while still in office.

Chief works

 Mariahilfkirche at Freystadt Abbey (1700–08)
 New church of St. Mary of Fürstenfeld Abbey (1701-?) (completed in 1747).)
 Schäftlarn Abbey
 Expansion of Benediktbeuern Abbey
 Expansion of the Palace of Nymphenburg (1702 - )
 Bürgersaal in Munich (1709/1710)
 Dreifaltigkeitskirche in Munich (1711–1714).)

References

1645 births
1713 deaths
People from Moesa District
Swiss Roman Catholics
Swiss Baroque architects
German Baroque architects
Architects of the Bavarian court